Senator Madden may refer to:

Edward M. Madden (1818–1885), New York State Senate
Fred H. Madden (born 1954), New Jersey State Senate